Trouble on Wheels is a 2015 Turkish action film directed by Burak Aksak.

Cast 
 Cengiz Bozkurt - Kudret
 Seda Bakan - Burcu
 Erkan Kolçak Köstendil - Güven
  - Efkan
  - Zabita Amiri
  - Atilgan

References

External links 

2015 comedy films
Turkish comedy films